Qilwah Club is a Saudi Arabian football club based in Qilwah, Al-Bahah and competes in the Saudi Second Division, the third tier of Saudi football. The club also consists of various other departments including volleyball, weightlifting and table tennis.

The club was founded on 27 October 2014 and its first president was Mousa bin Rashed Al-Zahrani.

Qilwah won their first promotion to the Saudi Second Division during the 2021–22 season after defeating Al-Jubail on penalties in the promotion play-offs.

History
Qilwah was founded on 27 October 2014 when the club was officially registered with the General Sports Authority. The club's first president was Mousa bin Rashed Al-Zahrani. Due to Mousa bin Rashed's battle with his illness, Saad Al-Duwaihi, the club's vice-president, was named as interim president. On 25 November 2016, Al-Duwaihi was named as the club's president following the death of Mousa bin Rashed. On 22 June 2016, Qilwah appointed their first ever foreign manager, the Egyptian Sami Abdel Halim. During the 2016–17 season Qilwah competed in the Regional League for the first time in their history. On 12 October 2017, Mousa Al Khudran Al-Zahrani was appointed as Qilwah's president following the resignation of Saad Al-Duwaihi. During the 2018–19 season, Qilwah reached the knockout stages of the Saudi Regional League for the first time in their history after being crowned champions of Al-Bahah Regional League. Qilwah were eliminated by Habouna after losing 5–4 on aggregate in the Round of 32. On 23 October 2019, Ali bin Obeid Al-Salahi was appointed as the president of Qilwah for 4 years.

During the 2020–21 season, Qilwah finished first in the joint Al-Bahah and Mecca Regional League and reached the knockout stages of the Saudi Regional League for the second time in their history. During the Round of 32, Qilwah defeated Al-Omran 2–1 on aggregate before losing to Al-Shaheed in the Round of 16. Following the introduction of the Saudi Third Division, it was announced that Qilwah would be among the teams participating in the league. On 13 August 2021, Qilwah introduced their new club logo and club identity. In their debut season in the fourth tier of Saudi football, Qilwah finished second in their group behind Jerash. Qilwah qualified to the promotion play-offs where they faced Al-Jubail. Qilwah defeated Al-Jubail 8–7 on penalties (0–0 on aggregate) to qualify to the Saudi Second Division for the first time in their history. On 21 July 2022, Tunisian footballer Anis Khedher signed for Qilwah and became the first foreign player to play for the club.

Current squad 

As of 30 September 2022:

Presidential history
As of 1 January 2021.

References

External links

Football clubs in Saudi Arabia
Football clubs in Qilwah
2014 establishments in Saudi Arabia
Association football clubs established in 2014